Ibrahim Ghandour (born 6 December 1952) was the Foreign Minister of Sudan from 9 June 2015 to 19 April 2018 and the former head of the ruling National Congress Party.

Ghandour, whose background is in academia as opposed to the military, was chosen as part of an attempt by the Sudanese government to boost ties with the United States. Ghandour is a former presidential assistant, and also previously worked as a consultant with the World Health Organization.

Ghandour was imprisoned in 2020 after Omar Bashir's ouster. He was released from prison after the October 2021 Sudanese coup d'état but was imprisoned again the following day.

See also
List of foreign ministers in 2017
List of current foreign ministers

References

External links

Living people
Foreign ministers of Sudan
1952 births
National Congress Party (Sudan) politicians
Leaders of political parties
Sudanese academics